Erepsilepis is an extinct thelodont agnathan genus in the family Phlebolepididae.

See also 
 List of prehistoric jawless fish genera
 List of thelodont genera

References

External links 
 

 

Thelodonti genera
Fossils of Canada
Canadian Arctic Archipelago